Derrell Scott Palmer (born September 15, 1948) is a former American football defensive tackle who played in the National Football League for two seasons. He played college football at Texas.

Professional career
Palmer was selected by the New York Jets in the seventh round of the 1971 NFL Draft. He played two games for the Jets in the 1971 season. The next season, Palmer played in five games for the St. Louis Cardinals.

References

External links
 Pro Football Archives bio

1948 births
Living people
American football defensive tackles
Texas Longhorns football players
New York Jets players
St. Louis Cardinals (football) players
People from Cleburne, Texas
Players of American football from Houston